Federal Highway 90D is a toll highway between Zapotlanejo and Guadalajara, Jalisco. The road is operated by Red de Carreteras de Occidente, which charges cars 70 pesos to travel Highway 90D. RCO operates the segments of Mexican Federal Highway 15D and Mexican Federal Highway 80D that connect into the road.

References 

Mexican Federal Highways